Urban informatics refers to the study of people creating, applying and using information and communication technology and data in the context of cities and urban environments. It sits at the conjunction of urban science, geomatics, and informatics, with an ultimate goal of creating more smart and sustainable cities. Various definitions are available, some provided in the Definitions section. 

Although first mentions of the term date back as early as 1987, urban informatics did not emerge as a notable field of research and practice until 2006 (see History section). Since then, the emergence and growing popularity of ubiquitous computing, open data and big data analytics, as well as smart cities, contributed to a surge in interest in urban informatics, not just from academics but also from industry and city governments seeking to explore and apply the possibilities and opportunities of urban informatics.

Definitions 

Many definitions of urban informatics have been published and can be found online. The descriptions provided by Townsend in his foreword and by Foth in his preface to the Handbook of Research on Urban Informatics emphasize two key aspects: (1) the new possibilities (including real-time data) for both citizens and city administrations afforded by ubiquitous computing, and (2) the convergence of physical and digital aspects of the city.

In this definition, urban informatics is a trans-disciplinary field of research and practice that draws on three broad domains: people, place and technology.

 "People" can refer to city residents, citizens, and community groups, from various socio-cultural backgrounds, as well as the social dimensions of non-profit organisations and businesses. The social research domains that urban informatics draws from include urban sociology, media studies, communication studies, cultural studies, city planning and others.
 "Place" can refer to distinct urban sites, locales and habitats, as well as to larger-scale geographic entities such as neighbourhoods, public space, suburbs, regions, or peri-urban areas. The place or spatial research domains entail urban studies, architecture, urban design, urban planning, geography, and others.
 "Technology" can refer to various types of information and communication technology and ubiquitous computing / urban computing technology such as mobile phones, wearable devices, urban screens, media façades, sensors, and other Internet of Things devices. The technology research domains span informatics, computer science, software engineering, human–computer interaction, and others.

In addition to geographic data/spatial data, most common sources of data relevant to urban informatics can be divided into three broad categories: government data (census data, open data, etc.); personal data (social media, quantified self data, etc.); and sensor data (transport, surveillance, CCTV, Internet of Things devices, etc.).

Although closely related, Foth differentiates urban informatics from the field of urban computing by suggesting that the former focusses more on the social and human implications of technology in cities (similar to the community and social emphases of how community informatics and social informatics are defined), and the latter focusses more on technology and computing. Urban informatics emphasises the relationship between urbanity, as expressed through the many dimensions of urban life, and technology.

Later, with the increasing popularity of commercial opportunities under the label of smart city and big data, subsequent definitions became narrow and limited in defining urban informatics mainly as big data analytics for efficiency and productivity gains in city contexts – unless the arts and social sciences are added to the interdisciplinary mix. This specialisation within urban informatics is sometimes referred to as 'data-driven, networked urbanism' or urban science.

In the book Urban Informatics published in 2021, the term Urban Informatics has been defined in a systematical and principled way.

History 

One of the first occurrences of the term can be found in Mark E. Hepworth's 1987 article "The Information City", which mentions the term "urban informatics" on page 261. However, Hepworth's overall discussion is more concerned with the broader notion of "informatics planning". Considering the article pre-dates the advent of ubiquitous computing and urban computing, it does contain some visionary thoughts about major changes on the horizon brought about by information and communications technology and the impact on cities.

The Urban Informatics Research Lab was founded at Queensland University of Technology in 2006, the first research group explicitly named to reflect its dedication to the study of urban informatics. The first edited book on the topic, the Handbook of Research on Urban Informatics, published in 2009, brought together researchers and scholars from three broad domains: people, place, and technology; or, the social, the spatial, and the technical.

There were many precursors to this transdisciplinarity of "people, place, and technology." From an architecture, planning and design background, there is the work of the late William J. Mitchell, Dean of the MIT School of Architecture and Planning, and author of the 1995 book City of Bits: Space, Place, and the Infobahn. Mitchell was influential in suggesting a profound relationship between place and technology at a time when mainstream interest was focused on the promise of the Information Superhighway and what Frances Cairncross called the "Death of Distance". Rather than a decline in the significance of place through remote work, distance education, and e-commerce, the physical / tangible layers of the city started to mix with the digital layers of the internet and online communications. Aspects of this trend have been studied under the terms community informatics and community networks.

One of the first texts that systematically examined the impact of information technologies on the spatial and social evolution of cities is Telecommunications and the City: Electronic Spaces, Urban Places, by Stephen Graham and Simon Marvin. The relationship between cities and the internet was further expanded upon in a volume edited by Stephen Graham entitled Cybercities Reader and by various authors in the 2006 book Networked Neighbourhoods: The Connected Community in Context edited by Patrick Purcell. Additionally, contributions from architecture, design and planning scholars are contained in the 2007 journal special issue on "Space, Sociality, and Pervasive Computing" published in the journal Environment and Planning B: Planning and Design, 34(3), guest edited by the late Bharat Dave, as well as in the 2008 book Augmented Urban Spaces: Articulating the Physical and Electronic City, edited by Alessandro Aurigi and Fiorella De Cindio, based on contributions to the Digital Cities 4 workshop held in conjunction with the Communities and Technologies (C&T) conference 2005 in Milan, Italy.

The first prominent and explicit use of the term "urban informatics" in the sociology and media studies literature appears in the 2007 special issue "Urban Informatics: Software, Cities and the New Cartographies of Knowing Capitalism" published in the journal Information, Communication & Society, 10(6), guest edited by Ellison, Burrows, & Parker. Later on, in 2013, Burrows and Beer argued that the socio-technical transformations described by research studies conducted in the field of urban informatics give reason for sociologists more broadly to not only question epistemological and methodological norms and practices but also to rethink spatial assumptions.

In computer science, the sub-domains of human–computer interaction, ubiquitous computing, and urban computing provided early contributions that influenced the emerging field of urban informatics. Examples include the Digital Cities workshop series (see below), Greenfield's 2006 book Everyware: The Dawning Age of Ubiquitous Computing, and the 2006 special issue "Urban Computing: Navigating Space and Context" published in the IEEE journal Computer, 39(9), guest edited by Shklovski & Chang, and the 2007 special issue "Urban Computing" published in the IEEE journal Pervasive Computing, 6(3), guest edited by Kindberg, Chalmers, & Paulos.

Digital Cities Workshop Series 

The Digital Cities Workshop Series started in 1999 and is the longest running academic workshop series that has focused on, and profoundly influenced, the field of urban informatics. The first two workshops in 1999 and 2001 were both held in Kyoto, Japan, with subsequent workshops since 2003 held in conjunction with the biennial International Conference on Communities and Technologies (C&T).

Each Digital Cities workshop proceedings have become the basis for key anthologies listed below, which in turn have also been formative to a diverse set of emerging fields, including urban informatics, urban computing, smart cities, pervasive computing, internet of things, media architecture, urban interaction design, and urban science.

Research centres

Methods 

The diverse range of people, groups and organisations involved in urban informatics is reflective of the diversity of methods being used in its pursuit and practice. As a result, urban informatics borrows from a wide range of methodologies across the social sciences, humanities, arts, design, architecture, planning (including geographic information systems), and technology (in particular computer science, pervasive computing, and ubiquitous computing), and applies those to the urban domain. Examples include:

 Action research and participatory action research
 Big data analytics and urban science
 Critical theory
 Cultural mapping
 Grounded theory
 Interaction design
 Participatory design
 Spatial analysis, including urban modelling, complex urban systems analysis, geographic information systems, and space syntax analysis
 User-centred design

See also 
 Communicative ecology
 Community informatics
 E-government
 Geoinformatics
 Human–computer interaction
 Interaction design
 Location-based service
 Locative media
 Placemaking
 Ubiquitous computing
 Urban computing

References

Further reading 

Since Foth's 2009 Handbook of Research on Urban Informatics, a number of books and special issues of academic journals have been published on the topic, which further demonstrate the increasing significance and notability of the field of urban informatics. Key works include:

External links
 Big Data for Urban Informatics and Earth Observation, ISPRS International Journal of Geo-Information
 The Use of Urban Informatics in Climate Risk Management, Climate Risk Management
 Advances in urban informatics, Environment and Planning B: Urban Analytics and City Science

Community networks
Human–computer interaction
Information society
Interdisciplinary subfields of sociology
Urban design
Urban planning